Over My Head is the eighth studio album by Gerry Rafferty, released in 1994. It is the follow-up to his album On a Wing and a Prayer and features many of the same musicians.  The album includes songwriting contributions from Joe Egan and a John Lennon cover. The album also includes Rafferty’s version of "Lonesome Polecat" a mournful ballad from Seven Brides for Seven Brothers. The final track on the album is a reworking of a song written for The Humblebums. 

This was the last album Hugh Murphy produced before his death in 1998.

Track listing

All songs by Gerry Rafferty except where noted:

Personnel
Gerry Rafferty – acoustic guitar, vocals, backing vocals
Arran Ahmun – drums, cymbal, percussion
Bryn Haworth – rhythm guitar, mandolin, acoustic guitar, electric guitar
Paweł Rosak – piano, keyboards, programming, bass guitar, harmonica, marimba
Mo Foster, Pete Zorn – bass guitar
Rab Noakes – acoustic guitar
Mel Collins – tenor saxophone, baritone saxophone
Ian Lynn – keyboards, synthesizer, string conductor
Julian Dawson – harmonica
Lianne Carroll – backing vocals
Nicky Moore – backing vocals
Brad Dawson – shaker

References

Gerry Rafferty albums
1994 albums